The 1997–98 Eredivisie season was contested by 18 teams. Ajax won the championship.

League standings

Results

Promotion/relegation play-offs
In the promotion/relegation competition, eight entrants (six from the Eerste Divisie and two from this league) entered in two groups. The group winners were promoted to (or remained in) the Eredivisie.

See also
 1997–98 Eerste Divisie
 1997–98 KNVB Cup

References

 Eredivisie official website - info on all seasons 
 RSSSF

Eredivisie seasons
Netherlands
1997–98 in Dutch football